Planetal is a municipality in the Potsdam-Mittelmark district, in Brandenburg, Germany.

History
From 1815 to 1947, the constituent localities of Planetal were part of the Prussian Province of Brandenburg. From 1952 to 1990, they were part of the Bezirk Potsdam of East Germany. On 1 July 2002, the municipality of Planetal was formed by merging the municipalities of Dahnsdorf, Kranepuhl, Mörz and Locktow.

Demography

References

Localities in Potsdam-Mittelmark
Fläming Heath